Archie Dagg (1899 – 1990) was a shepherd and traditional fiddler, piper and composer from central Northumberland. He was born at Linbriggs, in Upper Coquetdale, and except for his time in the Army at the end of the First World War, lived all his life in that region. In the late 1930s, he was a member of the English Sheepdog Trials Team; when competing with them in Scotland, he would play Scottish tunes on the Northumbrian smallpipes, and found he would get  a steady supply of free drams.

Musical career
Dagg learned the fiddle from his father, who forbade him to play anything but hymns on a Sunday; later he led the Hillbillies Dance Band during the 1920s and early 1930s. He was also an early member of the Northumbrian Pipers' Society; later he played as one of The Border Minstrels, along with Billy Pigg, John Armstrong (of Carrick), and Annie Snaith, from 1938. They did not play much during the war years, but restarted after the war. In a taped interview, another Border shepherd, Willie Scott, recalled
that traditional musicians were rarely influenced by records or radio, Archie Dagg the piper certainly wasn't. he also stated that very few musicians could read music, one old piper, a cousin of his fathers, could "trace out an air" from scores, though it took him a long time before he could play it right, Archie Dagg couldn't, he needed to hear an air.

After retiring from farming, and settling first at Swindon, near Rothbury, and later at Rodsley Court, Rothbury, Dagg took to pipemaking, and particularly reedmaking, for which he became highly respected.   Kathryn Tickell has stated that she learned on a set made by him; she still uses the bellows made by Archie Dagg with her current set. Francis Wood, himself a pipemaker, writes that "Dagg's best reeds were scraped relatively thin, giving a clear bright tone with a very rapid response, highly suitable for original Robert Reid chanters and others made after this pattern." Distinctively, he signed his reeds on the inside, in reverse, so his name is visible when the reed is held up to the light.  In the interview cited above, Willie Scott referred to "a tremendous set of pipes  that Archie Dagg had recently made from ivory". He signed his name on these musically, with the notes A DAGG shown on a stave.  An image of Archie himself playing these pipes was the cover photograph of The Northumbrian Pipers' Society Magazine, vol. 7, 1986.

His home at Rodsley Court was the venue for a regular weekly pipers' session for many years.
He also composed tunes - his tunebook, 'A Coquetdale Garland' published in 1978, was reissued in an expanded edition after his death, in 1995,  with a foreword by Joe Hutton. It includes 19 tunes, many of which have since become standards, regularly played at sessions, having been reprinted by the Northumbrian Pipers' Society and the Alnwick Pipers' Society. A recording on the FARNE Archive, by Joe Hutton includes three of these.

In taped interviews for a B.A. thesis, Dagg discussed how he started with the pipes, learning with Billy Pigg.  In another tape, he talked in detail about pipemaking,  and in a third he recalled Tom Clough, Richard Mowat, G.G. Armstrong and 'Kielder Jock' Davison. The recordings also include some of his playing, including his own 'Foxglove Hornpipe'. In the 1986 interview he remembered these musicians, and stated that Mowat was one of the best pipers ever, recalling his playing of the air "Caller Herrin"; he also recalled the playing of Harry Clough and Tom Clough, whose special tune was the variation set on "Maggy Lauder". He noted that formerly, most pipers were ear players, while nowadays they tend to play from written music; he preferred a happy medium. He deplored the tendency of some pipers to play tunes too fast, holding that to do so was not music at all.

Compositions
The Northumbrian Pipers' Second Tune Book
 Elsey's Waltz

Northumbrian Pipers Society Magazine, Vol. 7
 Coplech Burn Hornpipe (Sept, 1982)
 Archie Dagg's March (June, 1982)

The Coquetdale Garland
 Ella Dagg of Swindon's Reel
 Swindon (air)
 A. Dagg's Strathspey
 The Cowslip Hornpipe
 Hottery Bank Polka
 The Tomtit Reel
 Keenshaw Burn Jig
 The Stickdresser's Hornpipe
 The Pipemaker's Hornpipe
 Elsey's Waltz
 Whisky Glen Jig
 Nup Blossom (hornpipe)
 Joe Hutton's March
 Harehaugh Jig

The Northumbrian Pipers' Third Tune Book
 The Lady's Well (slow air)
 Joe Hutton's March
 The Foxglove Hornpipe

The Alnwick Pipers' Society, A Selection of Locally Composed Music
 Elsey's Waltz, seconds by Derek Hobbs
 Swindon (air), seconds by Annie Snaith

Unknown
 The Simonside Hornpipe
 Rodsley Court (reel)

Publications
 The Northumbrian Pipers' Second Tune Book, Northumbrian Pipers' Society, 1981.
 Northumbrian Pipers Society Magazine, Vol. 7, 1986
 The Northumbrian Pipers' Third Tune Book, Northumbrian Pipers' Society, 1991.
 The Coquetdale Garland, published by Iain Bain, Laverock Press, 1995.
 The Alnwick Pipers' Society, A Selection of Locally Composed Music, 2nd edition, B.& J. Say Smallpipes, 2002.

References

English folk musicians
1990 deaths
1899 births